Stikine, also known formerly as Boundary, is an unincorporated locality and former customs post on the Stikine River, located on the Canadian side of the British Columbia-Alaska boundary on the Stikine River's west (right) bank.  The customs post was seasonal and operated in the summer months only.  The name Boundary was in use from 1930 to 1964, with designation "Customs Post" changed in 1955 to "locality".

See also
Stikine Country
Stikine Gold Rush
Stikine Region
Fort Stikine
Choquette Hot Springs Provincial Park
Great Glacier Provincial Park
Boundary Falls, British Columbia (also known as Boundary)

References

External links
Image of "Boundary House" on Panoramio.com

Unincorporated settlements in British Columbia
Stikine Country
Populated places on the Stikine River